Zabrodzie may refer to the following places in Poland:
Zabrodzie, Lower Silesian Voivodeship (south-west Poland)
Zabrodzie, Podlaskie Voivodeship (north-east Poland)
Zabrodzie, Łódź Voivodeship (central Poland)
Zabrodzie, Lublin Voivodeship (east Poland)
Zabrodzie, Świętokrzyskie Voivodeship (south-central Poland)
Zabrodzie, Ostrołęka County in Masovian Voivodeship (east-central Poland)
Zabrodzie, Wyszków County in Masovian Voivodeship (east-central Poland)
Zabrodzie, Greater Poland Voivodeship (west-central Poland)
Zabrodzie, Silesian Voivodeship (south Poland)
Zabrodzie, Warmian-Masurian Voivodeship (north Poland)
Zabrodzie, West Pomeranian Voivodeship (north-west Poland)